Reproduction, Fertility and Development is an international peer-reviewed scientific journal published by CSIRO Publishing. The journal publishes original and significant contributions on vertebrate reproductive and developmental biology. Subject areas include, but are not limited to: physiology, biochemistry, cell and molecular biology, endocrinology, genetics and epigenetics, behaviour, immunology and the development of reproductive technologies in humans, livestock and wildlife, and in pest management.

The current editor-in-chief is Graeme Martin (University of Western Australia).

Abstracting and indexing 
The journal is abstracted and indexed in ABOA/Streamline, Australasian Medical Index, Elsevier BIOBASE, Biological Abstracts, BIOSIS, CAB Abstracts, Chemical Abstracts, Current Contents (Agriculture, Biology & Environmental Sciences), Current Contents (Life Sciences), Excerpta Medica/Embase, Index Medicus, MEDLINE, Reference Update, Science Citation Index, Scopus and Zoological Record.

Impact factor 
According to the Journal Citation Reports, the journal has a 2018 impact factor of 1.723.

References

External links 
 

NLM ID:  8907465

Publications established in 1989
CSIRO Publishing academic journals
Monthly journals